Dynamis is a biannual peer-reviewed academic journal covering the history of medicine and science. It publishes articles, notes, documents, and reviews in Spanish and English (with some articles in French, Italian, or Portuguese). Contents are freely accessible online six months after publication from Revistes Catalanes amb Accés Obert and SciELO.

History 
The journal was established in 1981 at the University of Granada by five historians of medicine (Luis García Ballester, Teresa Ortiz, Rosa María Moreno, Guillermo Olagüe and Esteban Rodríguez Ocaña). The first editorial note acknowledged the influence of Pedro Laín Entralgo, and justified the publication of the new journal by referring to the recent growing interest in the history of science, in particular the history of medicine, in Spain. From the beginning, the aim of the journal was to contribute to a comprehension of the practical and social aspects of medicine from a broad perspective including the history of scientific, educational, and medical institutions.

Abstracting and indexing 
The journal is abstracted and indexed in:

According to the Journal Citation Reports, the journal has a 2014 impact factor of 0.306.

References

External links 
 

History of science journals
History of medicine journals
Multilingual journals
Publications established in 1981
Biannual journals
University of Granada
Autonomous University of Barcelona
University of Cantabria
Creative Commons Attribution-licensed journals